Paraperlucidibaca wandonensis is a Gram-negative, strictly aerobic, catalase-negative, oxidase-positive, rod-shaped, nonmotile bacterium of the genus  Paraperlucidibaca.

References

External links
Type strain of Paraperlucidibaca wandonensis at BacDive -  the Bacterial Diversity Metadatabase

Moraxellaceae
Bacteria described in 2013